Charles Fagan (1 October 1881 – 8 May 1974) was an Irish politician. A farmer before entering politics, he was first elected to Dáil Éireann as a National Centre Party Teachta Dála (TD) for the Longford–Westmeath constituency at the 1933 general election. He became a Fine Gael TD on 8 September 1933 when Cumann na nGaedheal and the National Centre Party, along with the Army Comrades Association merged to form the new party of Fine Gael. He was elected as a Fine Gael TD for the Meath–Westmeath constituency at the 1937 general election. He was re-elected at the 1938, 1943 and 1944 general elections.

He left Fine Gael in 1947. He was elected as an Independent TD for Longford–Westmeath at the 1948 and 1951 general elections. He re-joined Fine Gael in 1954 and was elected as a Fine Gael TD for Longford–Westmeath at the 1954 general election, and was re-elected at the 1957 general election. He did not contest the 1961 general election.

References

1881 births
1974 deaths
National Centre Party (Ireland) TDs
Fine Gael TDs
Independent TDs
Members of the 8th Dáil
Members of the 9th Dáil
Members of the 10th Dáil
Members of the 11th Dáil
Members of the 12th Dáil
Members of the 13th Dáil
Members of the 14th Dáil
Members of the 15th Dáil
Members of the 16th Dáil
Politicians from County Westmeath
Irish farmers